Pandulf IV may refer to:

 Pandulf IV of Capua (died 1049/50)
 Pandulf IV of Benevento (died 1074)